Trackside may refer to:

 NASCAR Trackside, an American automotive television series which ran from 2010–2013
 TAB Trackside, a New Zealand horse racing and sports broadcast network
 Trackside (festival), see List of music festivals in Australia